Yeniköy Synagogue is a synagogue located along the northern part of the Bosphorus in the Yeniköy neighborhood of Istanbul, Turkey. The synagogue, said to have been built by Abraham Salomon Camondo in the late 19th century, has been rejuvenated recently by the renewed presence of Jews who have moved into the area. Only Shabbat prayers are held there.

See also
History of the Jews in Turkey
List of synagogues in Turkey

References and notes

External links
Chief Rabbinate of Turkey
Shalom Newspaper - The main Jewish newspaper in Turkey

Synagogues in Istanbul